The 1950 Brown Bears football team represented Brown University during the 1950 college football season.

In their first and only season under head coach Gus Zitrides, the Bears compiled a 1–8 record, and were outscored 271 to 147. L.H. Hill was the team captain.  

Brown played its home games at Brown Stadium in Providence, Rhode Island.

Schedule

References

Brown
Brown Bears football seasons
Brown Bears football